The Pirámide de Mayo, located at the hub of the Plaza de Mayo, is the oldest national monument in the City of Buenos Aires. Its construction was ordered in 1811 by the Primera Junta to celebrate the first anniversary of the May Revolution. It was renovated in 1856, under the direction of Prilidiano Pueyrredón. In 1912, after having undergone many modifications, it was moved 63 metres (68.9 yards) to the east, with the idea that a much larger monument would eventually be constructed around it.

The monument is crowned by an allegory of Liberty, the work of the French sculptor Joseph Dubourdieu. From the ground to the peak of the statue's Phrygian cap, the Pyramid measures 18.76 metres (61.5 feet).

Inauguration 
On April 5, 1811, with the approval of the Buenos Aires Cabildo, it was decided that the program of festivities commemorating the first anniversary of the Revolución de Mayo would include the construction of a pyramid. History does not record why a pyramidal form was chosen for the monument. Some speculate that it was an attempt to emulate the pyramids carved into the pillars of Paris' Porte Saint-Denis, to which the Pirámide de Mayo bears some resemblance. Since 1763 the Plaza de Mayo had been divided by the Vieja Recova (Old Arcade) into two smaller plazas: the one facing the eventual site of the Casa Rosada was known as the Plazoleta del Fuerte, and the one facing the Cabildo was known as the Plaza de la Victoria. The pyramid was situated in the center of the latter.

At the insistence of architect Pedro Vicente Cañete and Juan Gaspar Hernández, professor of sculpture at the University of Valladolid, it was decided that the monument would be constructed entirely out of solid materials, including 500 bricks, rather than out of wood, as had been planned originally. On April 6, the cement was poured to form the foundation, amid music and raucous celebration.

The monument was inaugurated as planned on National Day, despite the fact that Cañete had failed to meet the schedule and would not complete construction for several days. The pyramid was festooned with the banners of various illustrious regiments who had formed the garrison of Buenos Aires, including the patricians, highlanders, mulattoes and blacks, gunners, hussars, and grenadiers. The Pyramid as well as the Cathedral were heavily illuminated. The Recova was illuminated with 1,141 tallow candles. The festivities lasted four days and included dancing, raffles, and the manumission of slaves.

Although Cañete's original plans were lost, studies later determined that the Pyramid had been left hollow, rather than filled with masonry, in order to save time. It was made of baked adobe and stood thirteen metres tall, not including its  pedestal. A platform supported its pediment, which was built on top of two grades. It had a simple quadrilateral pedestal and a floating cornice that extended around the entire structure. It was crowned by a decorative globe. The edifice was surrounded by a railing supported by twelve pillars, each terminating in a rounded knob. At each of the fence's four corners was a pointed pole from which lanterns were hung.

On national holidays the Pyramid was decorated with banners, bunting, paper lanterns, and inscriptions.

In 1826 president Bernardino Rivadavia announced plans to erect a monument to the Revolución de Mayo which would consist of a magnificent bronze fountain "in place of what exists today". It was debated whether the new monument should replace the Pyramid. In any case, due to Rivadavia's resignation the following year, the project was never carried out, despite the fact that it had been approved by the legislature.

In 1852 the Jaunet brothers illuminated the Pyramid with gas, using a small gasometer. The public, accustomed to the small oil lanterns, was awestruck by the effect.

The Renovation 

By 1856 the museum had fallen into disrepair. The painter and architect Prilidiano Pueyrredón was charged with the restoration. He set out to transform the monument into something more artistic and grandiose. The modern pyramid was built directly over the old, which was covered in bricks and masonry to form a suitable foundation for the new additions.

The top of the statue was furnished with an allegory of Liberty, crowned with a Phrygian cap. This statue, standing 3.6 metres, was created by the French sculptor Joseph Dubourdieu from a combination of materials. Dubourdieu was also responsible for four other allegories, Industry, Commerce, The Sciences and The Arts, which were placed at the four corners of the pedestal.

The eastern face of the obelisk was adorned with a golden sun, which now faces toward the Casa Rosada. The remaining three sides are decorated with crowns of laurels in alto-relievo. Pueyrredón also modified the original pedestal and capital, increasing their height and breadth. Each of the four sides of the base was adorned with the national arms. A new fence was constructed and a gaslight placed at each corner.

In 1859, the deteriorating condition of the plaster led the city to reface the base in marble.

By 1873 the stucco and terracotta statues installed by Dubourdieu had not surprisingly begun to decay. Consequently, they were replaced with four Carrara marble statues which had originally been located on the first floor of the Banco Provincia on Calle San Martín. These were Geography, Astronomy, Navigation and Industry. These remained until 1912, when they were placed in storage. In 1972 they were installed in the old Plazoleta de San Francisco, at the intersection of Calles Defensa and Alsina, 150 metres from the modern Pyramid. In 2018 the statues were restored at their original positions at the corners of the pyramid.

In 1883, on the orders of intendente de la ciudad de Buenos Aires Torcuato de Alvear, the Recova was demolished, joining the Plazoleta del Fuerte and the Plaza del Victoria to form the modern Plaza de Mayo. Alvear had considered demolishing the Pyramid and erecting a more grandiose monument in its place, but in order to do so, required the permission of the deliberative council in charge of the project. The council consulted the opinion of various distinguished citizens, including ex-presidents Bartolomé Mitre, Domingo Faustino Sarmiento, and Nicolás Avellaneda. Mitre saw no reason to preserve the monument, because after its many renovations and additions it was no longer, in an authentic sense, the original Pyramid erected following the Revolution. He considered only the foundation worthy of preservation. Sarmiento also rejected the additions to the primitive structure. Avellaneda felt it should be restored to its original form and stripped of its more recent adornments, but not destroyed outright. In the end, none of these suggestions were acted upon, because although the majority favored demolition, the national government preferred the status quo.

The Relocation 
In 1906, with a few years until the centenary of the May Revolution, plans were put forward for a new monument that would completely contain the Pyramid, which consequently had to be relocated to the center of the Plaza de Mayo. This was not realized until 1912. After the marble statues had been removed, the Pyramid was enclosed with wood for protection. Two rails were laid, four metres apart, supported by masonry pillars that could support a weight of 225 metric tons. Under the Pyramid was a cement platform resting on solid wheels. Between November 12 and 20, the Pyramid was pulled 63.17 metres with a winch. A metal time capsule containing information about the relocation was buried under the Pyramid's new foundation.

Despite the success of the move, the project to surround the Pyramid with a larger monument never materialized. Many remained hopeful that the Pyramid would be restored to its historical origins, including the return of the steps and railing, and the removal of the "shell of stucco and inappropriate figures". However, later resolutions limited further reforms to ground level. The foundation was repainted and the arms restored to their 1813 condition. The original railing was, ultimately, restored.

Decree 120.412, issued May 21, 1942, declared the Pyramid a historical monument. Law 1.653, passed by the legislature of the city of Buenos Aires on March 10, 2005, conferred the status of a historical site on the area surrounding the Pyramid, which is notable for sidewalk paintings of shawls representing the Madres de Plaza de Mayo. On December 8 of that year, at the request of her children, the ashes of the organization's founder, Azucena Villaflor, were buried at the base of the Pyramid, where she had organized her first protest.

The Commemorative Plaque 
On the west side of the Pyramid is a bronze plaque, 85 cm wide and 57 cm high, on which two names are inscribed: Felipe Pereyra de Lucena and Manuel Artigas. These names, unknown to most who visit the Pyramid, were added to the monument in 1891 during the presidency of Carlos Pellegrini, in recognition of the first two military officers to lose their lives in the cause of Argentine independence:

Manuel Artigas was the brother of José Gervasio Artigas, the caudillo of the Banda Oriental, which was later to become Uruguay. Born in Montevideo in 1774, Manuel Artigas belonged to a revolutionary group which also included Domingo French and Antonio Beruti. He distinguished himself during the Paraguayan campaign of 1811, and was noted for his heroism at the Battle of Campichuelo. He was wounded on April 25 and died May 24 at the age of 33.
Felipe Pereyra de Lucena was born in 1789 and served as a cadet during the British invasions of the Río de la Plata. By the May Revolution he was already a lieutenant, having attained this rank during the campaign of Upper Peru. In 1811 he was promoted to captain. He was wounded in what is today Bolivia and transported to the settlement of Jesús Machaca, where he died on June 20 at the age of 22.
The news of these two casualties was met with shock, in response to which the government junta resolved to record the officers' names in bronze. However, due to lack of funds, the project was suspended. Pereyra's father petitioned the government in 1812, to no avail. In 1856, relatives of Pereyra once more appealed for the plaque's creation, but no action was taken. In 1891, the necessary funds were raised through popular subscription, and the plaque was installed on May 24 of that year.

See also

Buenos Aires
Buenos Aires (Landmarks)

References

 Revista Buenos Aires nos cuenta nº 15 (1991), Editor: Elisa Casella de Calderón.

External links

History of Buenos Aires
National Historic Monuments of Argentina
Tourist attractions in Buenos Aires
Monuments and memorials in Buenos Aires
Liberty symbols